The 2015–16 Scottish Premiership (known as the Ladbrokes Premiership for sponsorship reasons) was the third season of the Scottish Premiership, the highest division of Scottish football. The season began on 1 August 2015. Celtic were the defending champions.

Twelve teams contested the league: Aberdeen, Celtic, Dundee, Dundee United, Hamilton Academical, Heart of Midlothian, Inverness CT, Kilmarnock, Motherwell, Partick Thistle, Ross County and St Johnstone.

Teams

Promoted from Scottish Championship
 Heart of Midlothian

'''Relegated from Scottish Premiership
 St Mirren

Stadia and locations

Personnel and kits

Managerial changes

Tournament format and regulations

Basic 
In the initial phase of the season, the 12 teams will play a round-robin tournament whereby each team plays each one of the other teams three times. After 33 games, the league splits into two sections of six teams, with each team playing each other in that section. The league attempts to balance the fixture list so that teams in the same section play each other twice at home and twice away, but sometimes this is impossible. A total of 228 matches will be played, with 38 matches played by each team.

Promotion and relegation 
Heart of Midlothian were promoted as 2014–15 Scottish Championship winners. On 2 May, bottom club Dundee United were defeated 2–1 away to their city rivals Dundee, a defeat which confined them to relegation of the Championship. Craig Wighton, a local Dundee fan, scored the winning goal in the 92nd minute of the game. The champion of that league will be promoted to the Premiership for the 2016–17 season. The team that finishes 11th in the Premiership will play the winner of the Championship playoffs (teams that finish 2nd, 3rd and 4th in the Championship) in two playoff games, with the winner securing a Premiership spot for the 2016–17 season.

League table

Results

Matches 1–22
Teams play each other twice, once at home and once away.

Matches 23–33
Teams play every other team once (either at home or away).

Matches 34–38
After 33 matches, the league splits into two sections of six teams each, with teams playing every other team in their section once (either at home or away). The exact matches are determined upon the league table at the time of the split.

Top six

Bottom six

Top scorers

Awards

Premiership play-offs
The quarter-finals were contested between the 3rd and 4th placed teams in the Scottish Championship; Hibernian and Raith Rovers. Hibernian, the winners, advanced to the semi-finals to face the 2nd placed team in the Championship; Falkirk. Falkirk, the winners, advanced to the final to play-off against the 11th placed team in the Premiership,  Kilmarnock, with the winners securing a place in the 2016–17 Scottish Premiership.

Quarter-final

First leg

Second leg

Semi-final

First leg

Second leg

Final

First leg

Second leg

See also
Nine in a row

References

External links
Official website 

Scottish Premiership seasons
1
1
Scot